Anton Brady (born 7 February 1994) is a Scottish footballer who plays for Stranraer as a midfielder.

Career
Brady played youth football for Glenboig United, Aberdeen and Victoria Boys' Club, before joining St Mirren at the age of 16. He spent two seasons with East Kilbride, before signing for Queen's Park in June 2016. After another spell with East Kilbride, he signed for Stranraer in September 2021.

Career statistics

Honours
East Kilbride
Lowland League Cup: 2014–15; 2015–16
East of Scotland Qualifying Cup: 2015–16
East of Scotland City Cup: 2015–16

References

1994 births
Living people
Scottish footballers
Aberdeen F.C. players
St Mirren F.C. players
East Kilbride F.C. players
Queen's Park F.C. players
Stranraer F.C. players
Scottish Premier League players
Scottish Professional Football League players
Association football midfielders
Lowland Football League players